"Baby I'm Yours" is a song written by Van McCoy which was a hit in 1965 for Barbara Lewis, the original recording artist. The song was featured in the 1995 film The Bridges of Madison County and was included on the soundtrack album. It was also featured in the TV movies The Midnight Hour (1985) and An American Crime (2007), as well as being briefly featured in Baby Driver.

Composition and original recording
Barbara Lewis first recorded "Baby I'm Yours" in a January 8, 1965 Atlantic Recording Studios (NYC) session directed by Bert Berns with the producer credit assigned to Lewis's manager Ollie McLaughlin. The session for the track featured Teacho Wiltshire conducting his orchestra, whose personnel included Clark Terry and Dud Bascomb (trumpets), Jimmy Cleveland and Tony Studd (trombones), Frank Haywood Henry (baritone sax), Charlie Brown (tenor sax), Paul Griffin (piano), Bill Suyker (guitar), Jimmy Lewis (bass), Gary Chester (drums), and Artie Butler (percussion/ handclaps); the harmony background vocals on the track were provided by the song's composer, Van McCoy, singing with Kendra Spotswood

Barbara Lewis has stated that Van McCoy wrote "Baby I'm Yours" specifically for her. When she first heard the demo for "Baby I'm Yours" Lewis disliked the song—she has suggested that she actually was daunted by the high quality of the vocal, by McCoy himself, on the demo—and at the original session "I didn't really put 100% into my vocal performance" hoping that Atlantic would shelve the track as sub-par. "Ollie [McLaughlin] told me 'Barbara, we're gonna have to go back to Detroit and dub you in. We gotta do your vocals over. You're just not giving like you should on the song.' We did several takes [in Detroit] and he was wondering 'How am I going to get this girl to give? She's so hard-headed.' He said 'You know, Barbara, Karen can sing that song better than you.' That was his little daughter. And it pissed me off. I did one more take, and that was the take that they selected." It has also been reported that Lewis dubbed her vocal in a Chicago studio.

Commercial performance
Released in April 1965, Lewis' "Baby I'm Yours" enjoyed staggered regional success exemplified by the single reaching #1 in Detroit as early as June 1965 and peaking at #4 in Chicago that August: the national peak of the single was #11 achieved on the Hot 100 in Billboard dated August 21, 1965. "Baby I'm Yours" afforded Lewis a #5 R&B chart hit.

Charts

The Paramounts/ Peter and Gordon versions

A version by Peter and Gordon was released in 1965 by Columbia: the track would be included on the duo's 1966 Lady Godiva album.

Development
The first UK recording of "Baby I'm Yours" was made by the Paramounts at Abbey Road Studios in the summer of 1965, but the track went unreleased until their 1998 compilation release The Paramounts at Abbey Road 1963 to 1970. A higher-profile act also on the Columbia [UK] roster, Peter and Gordon, had the UK hit version of the song, released October 15, 1965, which reached #19 in the UK. The Peter and Gordon version was recorded in an Abbey Road session produced by Norman Newell and featuring Big Jim Sullivan on guitar. Peter Asher—who was partnered with Gordon Waller as Peter and Gordon—would recall: "We did 'Baby I'm Yours' because I loved the original Barbara Lewis record."

Commercial performance
"Baby I'm Yours" is unique among Peter and Gordon singles as their sole collaboration with arranger Tony Osborne, who took over from the duo's original regular collaborator Geoff Love (subsequent to "Baby I'm Yours" Peter and Gordon regularly collaborated with arranger/conductor Bob Leaper). Also in deference to the US success of the Barbara Lewis version, Capitol Records (Peter and Gordon's US label of release) did not issue the duo's "Baby I'm Yours" single; the Peter and Gordon US single release concurrent with their UK "Baby I'm Yours" single release was "Don't Pity Me", a composition by the duo which peaked at #83. "Baby I'm Yours" was the first Peter and Gordon UK single not be released concurrently in the US.

Charts

Jody Miller version

Jody Miller recorded "Baby I'm Yours" with producer Billy Sherrill1 in a June 16, 1971 session at the Columbia studio in Nashville for inclusion on the album He's So Fine, entitled for Miller's current Top Ten C&W remake of the Chiffons' 1963 #1 hit.

Development
Miller's recording of "Baby I'm Yours" featured the Jordanaires chorale. Impressed by the 1968 Tammy Wynette hit "Stand by Your Man", Miller had contacted that track's producer Billy Sherrill in the hopes of reviving her own flagging recording career. After Look at Mine—Miller's first album in Sherrill's charge—generated two Top Twenty C&W hits in 1970, Sherrill opted for a new musical direction for Miller, who recalls: "He said I didn't phrase my words like a country singer, so we took some old, sexy pop songs and put in a little boppy steel guitar." Issued September 1, 1971 as the second single off He's So Fine, "Baby I'm Yours" reached #5 C&W and #21 Adult Contemporary and afforded Miller her fifth and final Hot 100 showing with a Hot 100 peak of #91.

Charts

Cass Elliot version

Cass Elliot's remake of "Baby I'm Yours" was released in February 1972 at the same time as its parent album Cass Elliot.

Development
Elliot's version was produced by Lewis Merenstein and arranged/conducted by Benny Golson. The album was Elliot's debut for RCA Victor who insisted on "Baby I'm Yours" release as the lead single over Elliott and Merenstein's choice: "That Song", a new song by Bill Dean, which would be given single release in April 1972. Neither "Baby I'm Yours" or "That Song" afforded Elliot an appearance on a Billboard chart. Elliot's "Baby I'm Yours" charted on the Canadian Adult Contemporary hitlist, peaking at #18.

Track list
CD single
"Baby I'm Yours"
"Cherries Jubilee"

Charts

Linda Lewis version

In May 1976, a disco remake of "Baby I'm Yours" was released by Linda Lewis, who in 1967 had chosen Lewis as her professional surname in honor of Barbara Lewis, the original singer of "Baby I'm Yours".

Development
Recorded subsequent to Lewis' 1975 album Not a Little Girl Anymore, and not included on her next album release Woman Overboard (1977), "Baby I'm Yours" was included as a bonus track on the 2001 CD release of Not a Little Girl Anymore. The song reached #33 in United Kingdom charts.

Track list
CD single
"Baby I'm Yours"
"The Other Side"

Charts

Debby Boone version

Debby Boone recorded "Baby I'm Yours" in the summer of 1977 with the track included on Boone's album You Light Up My Life

Development
The song was issued as a single in March 1978 with "God Knows", a track from Boone's Midstream album, as its flip side. Peter Noone, the co-writer of "God Knows", has alleged "['God Knows'] was originally intended to be the A-side. But the record company chickened out and went with [the] cover of 'Baby I'm Yours' instead." Boone's "Baby I'm Yours" peaked at #22 C&W while on the Hot 100 the track peaked at #74 and on the Easy Listening it reached #14, both in a tandem ranking with "God Knows".

Track list
CD single
"Baby I'm Yours"
"God Knows"

Charts

Tanya Tucker version

Tanya Tucker recorded "Baby I'm Yours" for her sole Arista album release Changes, from which the song was issued as the third single in July 1983, peaking at C&W #22.

Track list
CD single 1
"Baby I'm Yours"
"I Don't Want You to Go"

CD single 2
"Baby I'm Yours"
"Baby I'm Yours" (Radio edit)
"Baby I'm Yours" (Remix)
"I Don't Want You to Go"

Charts

Cher version

Background
Cher remade "Baby I'm Yours" for the soundtrack of her 1990 film vehicle Mermaids. Cher's version was arranged to replicate Barbara Lewis' hit, and was produced by Peter Asher, who as a member of Peter and Gordon had had the UK hit of "Baby I'm Yours".  The song was not featured in the film but was selected as the lead single from the soundtrack for release in the UK and Europe after the US single release "The Shoop Shoop Song"—which as remade by Cher had played under the film's closing credits—fell short of the Billboard Top Thirty. "Baby I'm Yours" failed as a single; its only apparent charting was in the UK at #89 and its estimated global sales tally is 100,000 units. "The Shoop Shoop Song" was released in the spring of 1991 with "Baby I'm Yours" as the B-side, and spent five weeks at #1 in the UK and achieved Top Ten status in several European countries as well as Australia and New Zealand. (Coincidentally the precedent charting single to the Linda Lewis 1976 UK hit remake of "Baby I'm Yours" had been the first major UK hit version of "The Shoop Shoop Song", entitled "It's in His Kiss".)

Track listing
European 7" and cassette single
"Baby I'm Yours" – 3:16
"Hard Enough Getting Over You" – 3:46

European 12" and CD single
"Baby I'm Yours" – 3:16
"Hard Enough Getting Over You" – 3:46
"Just Like Jesse James" – 4:06

Charts

Other versions

B-side of Arctic Monkeys' 2006 UK hit "Leave Before the Lights Come On" (#4); that version featured the 747s with shared vocals by Arctic Monkeys' lead singer Alex Turner and the 747s' lead singer Oisin Leech.
The song's composer Van McCoy produced a recording of the song by Chris Bartley, which was a non-charting 1968 single release.
Cilla Black (album Cilla Sings a Rainbow/ 1966)
Petula Clark (album Now/ 1 1972)
Donny Gerrard (album The Romantic/ 1999)
Susan Jacks (album Forever/ 1982)
Jack Jones (album For The "In" Crowd/ 1966)
The Jones Girls (album On Target/ 1983)
June Lodge (album Someone Loves You Honey/ 1980)
KC and the Sunshine Band (album The Painter/ 1981)
Diane Marino featuring Houston Person (album Just Groovin'''/ 2008)
Maureen McGovern (album Baby I'm Yours/ 1992)
Nilsson (in medley with "Just One Look", a duet with Lynda Laurence, on the album ...That's the Way It Is/ 1976)
Phoebe Snow and Avenue Blue (featuring Jeff Golub) (album Naked City/ 1996)
Dianne Steinberg (album Universal Child/ 1977)
Bobby Vee (in medley with "Make It Easy on Yourself", on the album 30 Big Hits of the '60's, Vol. 2/ 1966)
Bobby Vinton (album My Elusive Dreams/ 2 1970)
Kim Weston (album It Should Have Been Me/ 1998)
Rita Wilson (album Every Mother Counts 2012/ 2012)
A French-language rendering of "Baby I'm Yours" entitled "Je T'appartiens" was a 1965 single release by Pierre Lalonde and was included on Lalonde's 1966 album release Louise. (This is an exceptional use of the title "Je T'appartiens" which is generally understood to refer to the French-language original of "Let It Be Me".)

 In the 1999 film The Other Sister, "Baby I'm Yours" is performed at an engagement party by a cappella group Double Dare featuring Mary Lou Metzger. 
 In the episode of the NBC-TV series American Dreams entitled "And Promises to Keep", Barbara Lewis—portrayed by Vanessa Soul—is seen rehearsing "Baby I'm Yours" for an American Bandstand performance. 
 In the 2009 film Last Chance Harvey, "Baby I'm Yours" is apparently performed live at a wedding reception, although the track was in fact recorded by a session group credited as Loser's Lounge, none of whose members appear in the film; the track was produced and arranged by Joe McGinty, heard on piano, while the vocalist is Connie Petruk.
 In the 13th episode of the 3rd season of the CBC original series Schitt's Creek'', Moira (Catherine O'Hara) sings this song with her choir to her daughter Alexis (Annie Murphy) on Alexis' graduation day.

References

External links
Official Cher site
 

1965 singles
1971 singles
1976 singles
1978 singles
1983 singles
1990 singles
Arctic Monkeys songs
Debby Boone songs
Cher songs
Petula Clark songs
Cass Elliot songs
Barbara Lewis songs
Jody Miller songs
Peter and Gordon songs
Tanya Tucker songs
Bobby Vee songs
Songs written by Van McCoy
Atlantic Records singles
Columbia Records singles
Arista Records singles
MCA Records singles
1965 songs
Song recordings produced by Bert Berns
Song recordings produced by Michael Lloyd
Song recordings produced by Mike Curb
Song recordings produced by Lewis Merenstein